The Central Pacific Railroad Depot in Lovelock, Nevada was erected in 1880 in the Stick style or Eastlake style, functioning as the principal point of access to the town in the late 19th and early 20th centuries. The building was originally located on the northeast corner of West Broadway Avenue and Main Street, but was moved by the town in 1999 to its present site across Broadway Avenue.

The building consists of two wood frame sections; a 1½ story section to the south comprising the baggage room, and a two-story section to the north containing the passenger waiting room, agent's office and agent's quarters. Both portions are extensively detailed with finials, braces, brackets and flat board trim. The depot was built to the Central Pacific Railroad's "Combination Depot #2" design, the only example of its type in Nevada, but one of six built on the Central Pacific system. None of the other five examples is known to have survived.

The station was a regular stop for transcontinental train traffic, and was expanded in 1917. The Amtrak California Zephyr stopped at the station until May 11, 1997. When what was now the Union Pacific Railroad announced plans to tear the depot down in 1998 the City of Lovelock expressed interest in the building. The same year the railroad signed over the building and a $42,500 donation, the projected cost of demolition. The town moved it from railroad property, completing a restoration in 2000, with help from prison labor. It was placed on the National Register of Historic Places in 2004. The depot is leased to private retail businesses.

References

External links

 Railroad Depot — City of Lovelock

Railway stations in the United States opened in 1880
Queen Anne architecture in Nevada
Buildings and structures in Pershing County, Nevada
Railway stations on the National Register of Historic Places in Nevada
Former Southern Pacific Railroad stations in Nevada
National Register of Historic Places in Pershing County, Nevada
Lovelock
Railway stations closed in 1997
1880 establishments in Nevada
1997 disestablishments in Nevada